This list comprises acts that record, or have recorded at some time, for Mercury Records. A star (*) denotes a former artist.



0-9

 10cc*
 4 Hero*

A

 ABC*
 AJR
 Paula Abdul*
 Oleta Adams*
 Lauren Alaina
 Daniele Alexander
 Alisha's Attic
 All About Eve*
 Graeme Allwright
 Alsou
 American Authors
 Albert Ammons
 Tori Amos 
 Anastacia*
 Cat Anderson
 Ernestine Anderson
 Animal Bag 
 Animotion*
 Aphrodite's Child*
 Aqua
 Jan August
 Sil Austin
 Zoë Avril
 Steve Azar*
 Iggy Azalea 
 Charles Aznavour*

B

 Babyface
 Bachman–Turner Overdrive*
 Ross Bagdasarian*
 Butch Baker*
 Josephine Baker*
 The Bama Band*
 Buju Banton*
 The Bar-Kays
 Count Basie*
 Axel Bauer
 Bee Gees 
 Billy Ray Cyrus
 Justin Bieber
 Robin Beck*
 Brook Benton*
 Chuck Berry*
 The Big Bopper*
 Big Country*
 Bill Kenny  aka Ink Spots *
 Biohazard*
 Black Sheep*
 Blahzay Blahzay*
 Blood Red Shoes*
 Kurtis Blow*
 Blue Pearl*
 Blues Magoos
 Bon Jovi/Jon Bon Jovi*
 Ronnie Bond
 Daniel Boone*
 Larry Boone*
 David Bowie*
 Boy Kill Boy
 The Brains
 Bo Bruce*
 Lindsey Buckingham*
 Jake Bugg
 Laura Bell Bundy
 The Burch Sisters
 George Burns*
 Kristian Bush 
 Jerry Butler
 Jerry Byrd

C

Steve Clark
 Ryan Cabrera
 J. J. Cale
 Calogero 
 Caligula
 Cameo*
 Candy
 Jenny Lou Carson*
 Captain Beefheart*
 The Cardigans*
 Rodney Carrington*
 David Carroll
 Anita Carter
 Johnny Cash
 Gene Chandler
 Louis Chedid 
 Christophe 
 Chuck D*
 Central Line
 Cinderella*
 Circle Jerks
 City Boy 
 Terri Clark*
 Coldwater Jane 
 Lloyd Cole 
 Al Corley
 Company of Wolves
 Con Funk Shun*
 Julian Cope 
 Easton Corbin 
 Corbin/Hanner*
 Neal Coty*
 Coven
 Billy "Crash" Craddock*
 Harrison Craig 
 Cream 
 The Creation
 Taio Cruz
 Xavier Cugat
 The Crew-Cuts
 Billy Currington
 Billy Ray Cyrus*

D

 Darren Hayes
 The Damned Things
 Vic Damone*
 Darius Danesh*
 Davis Daniel*
 Billy Daniels
 The Danleers
 Daniel Darc 
 D'banj
 Jimmy Dean*
 Mike Deasy*
 Deep Purple*
 Def Leppard*
 The Del Vikings
 Denada
 Wesley Dennis*
 Dewi Sandra 
 Dexys Midnight Runners 
 Manu Dibango*
 The Diamonds
 Diamond D*
 Dio* 
 D.J. Chuck Chillout & Kool Chip*
 Dot Rotten*
 Lonnie Donegan
 Antal Doráti*
 downset.*
 Dragonette
 Rusty Draper
 Drippin 
 Duffy
 Dash and Will

E

 Billy Eckstine
 Ed O.G. & da Bulldogs*
 Joel Edwards 
 Meredith Edwards*
 Electribe 101*
 Elodie Frégé 
 Elsa Lunghini 
 Emcee N.I.C.E. 
 The Everly Brothers*
 The Envy Corps
 Era
 Coke Escovedo
 Sara Evans
 Leon Everette*
 Example 
 Exuma

F

 Face to Face
 Faith Band*
 Fall Out Boy
 Christine Fan 
 Donna Fargo*
 Frederick Fennell
 Fighting Gravity
 Fine Young Cannibals
 Finger Eleven*
 Tony Fontane
 The Four Aces
 Elodie Frégé 
 Futures

G
 Peter Gabriel*
 Serge Gainsbourg*
 Gap Band (via Total Experience Productions) 
 The Gaslight Anthem
 Ronnie Gaylord
 The Gaylords
 Bob Geldof 
 Georgia Gibbs
 Giggs
 Kendji Girac
 Girlschool*
 Go 101
 God Street Wine
 Golden Child  
 Goldspot
 Selena Gomez
 Delta Goodrem
 Lesley Gore*
 Gorky Park
 Gotye
 Grace
 Ariana Grande
 Pat Green*
 Green on Red 
 Greta*
 Tito Guizar

H

 Steve Hackett* 
 Halfway to Hazard 
 Tom T. Hall* 
 Johnny Hallyday* 
 Herbie Hancock*
 Hanson*
 Howard Hanson
 Robin Harris* 
 Lee Hazlewood
 Roy Head
 Eric Heatherly* 
 Paul Heaton  
 The Herd 
 Earl Hines
 HiVi! 
 Stevie Hoang
 Hole
 Julianne Hough 
 Mr. Hudson 
 Homicide*
 Honeyz*

I

 Icona Pop
Iglu & Hartly
Ill Al Skratch*
 I Mother Earth*
 Incognito* 
 INXS*  (in Europe and Latin America only) 
IQ*

J

 Jakwob
 Jamiroquai
 James*
 Jessie James*
 Luke James
 Rick James*
 Jay & the Techniques
 Jeff Knight
 Herb Jeffries
 Jenifer
 Jerky Boys*
 Elton John  (except US) 
 Buddy Johnson
 Jamey Johnson 
 JoJo
 Nick Jonas
 George Jones* 
 David Jordan
 Louis Jordan
 Junior*

K

 The Kendalls* 
 The Kentucky Headhunters* 
 Sammy Kershaw* 
 Keith
 Toby Keith* 
 The Killers 
 Morgana King
 KISS*
 Kiss in the Dark (K.I.D.)* 
 Jeff Knight* 
 Mark Knopfler  (except US) 
 Kool & The Gang* 
 Kris Kristofferson*
 Krokus* 
 Kubb 
 Rafael Kubelík*
 Kate Ceberano

L

 Jennifer Lopez 
 Pixie Lott*
 Frankie Laine*
 Lamb* 
 The Last Poets* 
 Marc Lavoine 
 Tracy Lawrence*  
 Eddie Layton*  
 Jena Lee 
 Legendary Stardust Cowboy
 Grégory Lemarchal 
 Nolwenn Leroy 
 Jerry Lee Lewis 
 Ramsey Lewis
 Lighter Shade of Brown
 Lindisfarne
 Lisa de'Blonk 
 Little Big Town* 
 Little Richard
 Cher Lloyd
 Loona 
 Zane Lowe 
 Laura Love*
 Love Unlimited*
 Love Unlimited Orchestra*
 Lulu

M

 Cledus Maggard* 
 Miriam Makeba*
 Chuck Mangione*
 Mann
 Marcel*
 Ida Maria
 Marilyn*
 The Marshall Tucker Band* 
 The Mauds
 Melissa Tkautz 
 Metallica 
 Tony Martin
 Brent Mason* 
 Carmen Mastren
 Ralph Marterie
 Johnny Mathis*  (1962–66) 
 Seiko Matsuda*
 Kathy Mattea* 
 Max Webster Outside of Canada
 Paul McCartney 
 Charly McClain* 
 Brian McComas* 
 The McCoys
 Scotty McCreery 
 Reba McEntire* 
 Rollee McGill
 Brian McKnight*
 Clyde McPhatter
 Glen Medeiros
 John Mellencamp*
 Men Without Hats*
 The Mighty Mighty Bosstones*
 Milburn*
 Buddy Miles
 Chuck Miller
 Roger Miller* 
 Steve Miller
 Shane Minor* 
 Chad Mitchell Trio
 The Mission UK*
 The Modern 
 The Modernaires
Mona 
 Agnes Monica 
 Mono* 
 Monsta X 
 Randy Montana 
 Melba Moore*
 Matthew Morrison
 Van Morrison
 Dick Morrissey*
 Buddy Morrow
 Monsoon*
 Nana Mouskouri* 
 Mother Earth* 
 Moxy
 My Darkest Days

N

 David Nail* 
 Naked Lunch
 Nashville Pussy
 Neon Trees
 Nero 
 Jennifer Nettles 
 Ne-Yo 
 New Colony Six*
 New York Dolls
 Alfred Newman
 Gary Nichols* 
 The Nice*
 Nine Inch Nails* (American/monarC/Brushfire/MLD Entertainment/Mercury)
 Noel Gallagher's High Flying Birds* 
 Noisettes*
 Novelist*
 NRBQ*

O

 Yūji Oda*
 Ohio Players*
 Mike Oldfield*
 Jamie O'Neal* 
 One Block Radius
 The Orb* 
 Roy Orbison*  (1976) 
 Orson 
 Joan Osborne* 
 James Otto* 
 One Night Only
 Mark Owen

P

 The Paddingtons 
 Jimmy Page & Robert Plant 
 Patti Page*
 Tiffany Page
 Mikill Pane
 Florent Pagny 
 Paper Lace
 Parachute
 Graham Parker*
 Parliament*
 Parlet*
 Paul Paray
 Dolly Parton* 
 Pat Paulsen*
 Johnny Paycheck* 
 Pere Ubu
 Carl Perkins
 Katy Perry 
 Oscar Peterson
 Phil Phillips
 Pixies Three
 Plan B
 Robert Plant 
 The Platters
 Portishead
 Robert Post
 Propaganda
 Johnny Preston
 Jeanne Pruett* 
 Red Prysock
 Pure Love
 Rafael Puyana
 The Penguins
 Post Malone

R

 The Radiators 
 Rainbow Butt Monkeys
 Raisa 
 RAN 
 Randy Rogers Band
 Kenny Rankin*
 The Rapture 
 Razorlight 
 Rebecca 
 Redd Kross
 Dan Reed Network
 The Reels 
 The Refreshments
 Burt Reynolds*
 Reza Artamevia
 J.P. Richardson
 Lionel Richie*
 Rihanna 
 The Robbs
 Julie Roberts 
 Rocket Riot
 Johnny Rodriguez
 Tommy Roe*
 Julie Rogers
 Rossa 
 Dot Rotten
 Demis Roussos
 Pete Rugolo
 The Runaways
 Rush* 
 Rusted Root

S

 Sa-Fire
 Maverick Sabre
 Richie Sambora
 Sandy & Junior
 Sania 
 Juelz Santana 
 Aggro Santos 
 The Saturdays
 Savage Resurrection*
 Scenario
 Scorpions  (US/Canada) 
 Lisa Scott-Lee* 
 Marvin Sease
 Stevie Hoang
 Sergeant 
 The Shangri-Las
 L. Shankar 
 Sherina Munaf 
 Michelle Shocked
 Vicky Shu 
 Beau Sia* 
 Lucie Silvas 
 Sinbad*
 Sir Douglas Quintet*  
 Roni Size* 
 Skint & Demoralised
 Smile
 Anthony Smith* 
 The Smothers Brothers*
 Son of Dork
 Jo-El Sonnier* 
 Soraya
 Takashi Sorimachi* 
 Southside Johnny & The Asbury Jukes
 Muggsy Spanier
 Spandau Ballet*
 Spanky & Our Gang
 Sparky's Flaw
 Special Needs
 Spirit
 Rick Springfield
 The Stanley Brothers
 Status Quo
 Ringo Starr*
 The Statler Brothers* 
 Keith Stegall* 
 Stephen Sanchez
 Stereophonics
 Ray Stevens*
 Rod Stewart*
 Streetwalkers 
 The Strypes
 Sugarland 
 Sum 41  (Island outside Canada) 
 Donna Summer*
 Gene Summers*
 Taylor Swift 
 Swing Out Sister*

T

 The Teardrop Explodes 
 Tears for Fears* 
 Teen Queens 
 Texas 
 Thin Lizzy* 
 Thirteen Senses 
 Thrice 
 Tiddas 
 Tim & Jean 
 Tim Rollinson 
 Titi DJ 
 Melissa Tkautz 
 Pete Tong 
 Tony! Toni! Toné!* 
 Trio
 Treponem Pal*
 The Troggs* 
 Shania Twain*
 Conway Twitty*

U

 U2
 Ugly Kid Joe 
 Uriah Heep 
 The Urgency
 Utada*

V

 Bobby Valentino 
 The Vamps 
 Van der Graaf Generator* 
 Sarah Vaughan
 The Vels

W

 Hannes Wader 
 The Wanted 
 Clifford T. Ward*
 Jacky Ward*
 Dinah Washington*
 Megan Washington 
 Crystal Waters*
 Ethel Waters
 Roger Waters*
 The Webb Sisters 
 Ted Weems
 The Welcome Mat 
 Lawrence Welk*
 John West
 Kanye West
 Tim Westwood 
 Wet Wet Wet 
 Barry White*
 Josh White
 Vanessa White 
 John & Audrey Wiggins*
 Lucinda Williams
 Vanessa Williams* 
 Mark Wills* 
 Matt Willis
 Patrick Wolf 
 Lee Ann Womack* 
 Wonderland 
 The Wrays*
 Chely Wright*
 Wright Brothers Band*

Y

 Yaggfu Front*
 Yarbrough and Peoples* (via Total Experience Productions)
 Young Jeezy 
 Jesse Colin Young
 Yuck 
 Timi Yuro

Z

 Frank Zappa 
 Zazie 
 Zerra 1

See also
Mercury Records
The Island Def Jam Music Group
Universal Music Group

References

 
Mercury Records